NGC 7033 is a lenticular galaxy located about 390 million light-years away in the constellation of  Pegasus. It is part of a pair of galaxies that contains the nearby galaxy NGC 7034. NGC 7033 was discovered by astronomer Albert Marth on September 17, 1863.

On July 2, 2016 a type 1a supernova designated as SN 2016cyt was discovered in NGC 7033. It had a maximum apparent magnitude of 18.0.

See also 
 NGC 7007
 NGC 7302

References

External links 

Lenticular galaxies
Pegasus (constellation)
7033
66228
Astronomical objects discovered in 1863